Dmitri Lugin (born April 1, 1990) is a Russian professional ice hockey winger who is currently an unrestricted free agent who most recently played with Admiral Vladivostok of the Kontinental Hockey League (KHL). He won the rookie of the year award in the 2011–12 KHL season while with Amur Khabarovsk.

References

External links

1990 births
Living people
Admiral Vladivostok players
Amur Khabarovsk players
HC Dynamo Moscow players
Lokomotiv Yaroslavl players
Russian ice hockey right wingers
HC Sochi players
HC Vityaz players